Michael Frass (born 1954, Vienna) is an Austrian medicine specialist for internal medicine and professor at the Medical University of Vienna (MUW). He is known for his work on homeopathy and his inventions in the field of airway management.

Biography 
He is First Chairman of the Scientific Society for Homeopathy (WissHom), founded in 2010, president of the Umbrella organization of Austrian Doctors for Holistic Medicine, since 2002 and since 1994 Vicepresident of the Doctors Association for Classical Homeopathy. Frass is the inventor of the Combitube, an emergency airway allowing blind insertion used in the pre-hospital and emergency setting. Frass holds several patents and registered designs.

Homoeopathic research 
A major interest of Frass is homeopathy according to Hahnemann. He has published several papers on this subject, in addition, he has edited a text book Homeopathy in Intensive- Care and Emergency Medicine together with Martin Bündner.

Article in the Oncologist 
In 2020 Frass published an article in the scientific journal The Oncologist. The results of the article were discussed outside of academic circles for example in the Wiener Zeitung. After criticism (for example from the Informationsnetzwerk Homöopathie), the Austrian Agency for Scientific Integrity (Österreichische Agentur für wissenschaftliche Integrität) concluded that the article contains data manipulation and forgery.

Airway
He has also published several papers investigating the influence of controlled mechanical ventilation on the release of atrial natriuretic peptide. Furthermore, Frass has investigated devices designed for securing the airway under emergency conditions. He has performed studies on a broad range of different alternate airways.

Inventions 
Rapid assessment and management of respiratory structure and function are imperative in emergency intubation. Endotracheal intubation remains the gold standard in airway maintenance. However, endotracheal intubation may be impossible due to difficult circumstances with respect to space and illumination or anatomy even for skilled physicians. Therefore, the need arises for a simple and efficient alternative. The Combitube was designed with this goal in mind.

Frass is the inventor of the Combitube, a twin lumen device designed for use in emergency situations and difficult airways. He has published several papers on this topic.

References

External links 

 Website of Frass (German)

Austrian internists
Austrian homeopaths
1954 births
Living people